Thomas F. Parkinson (1920–1992) Professor of English at the University of California, Berkeley, was a poet in his own right; an expert on the poetry of W. B. Yeats; and one of the first academic authorities to write about the Beat poets and novelists of San Francisco in the 1950s and 1960s. A deeply thoughtful man of great integrity, he was a quiet political activist for much of his life, and survived a murder attempt in 1961 by a deranged former student who sought to "get someone who was associated with Communism." Though Parkinson survived being shot in the face (and bore the scars of the assault for the rest of his life), the teaching assistant who was with him at the time was killed. Thomas Parkinson died of an apparent heart attack in 1992, at age 72, after a long illness.

Early life and influences
Parkinson's early life was affected by the Great Depression and the Second World War. Growing up in San Francisco as the son of a master-plumber union leader who was blacklisted during the General Strike of the late 1930s, Parkinson developed a respect for labor and a sensitivity to social injustice. He attended Lowell High School and some junior college, where he was inspired by gifted teachers. When WWII began, Parkinson enlisted in the Army, but was eventually discharged because he was too tall. In the years that followed, Parkinson worked a motley series of jobs, as an insurance agent, a ship's outfitter, and a lumberjack. And he continued to read widely and deeply. He eventually returned to UC Berkeley, where he completed his bachelor's degree in three years.

Academic career and activism
While he was developing an academic career at Berkeley in the 1950s, Parkinson became immersed in the continuing political battles of his times. He was one of the founders of KPFA-radio Berkeley when it was a free-form West Coast anarchist collective.  A tireless supporter of students both inside and outside the classroom, Parkinson made a number of public statements about paltry funding for student scholarships, including those for women students. An article he published in the campus newspaper, the Daily Californian, sparked the murder attempt by a former student who claimed to have been commanded by God. Parkinson was severely injured in the attack—several of his vertebrae were fused and his face permanently damaged, and the teaching assistant who was with him at the time was killed. Parkinson continued to promote liberal causes, however, and served as campus Ombudsman, chaired the Berkeley chapter of the American Association of University Professors (AAUP), and testified at the obscenity trial on behalf of Allen Ginsberg's Howl. He was instrumental in helping promote humanities study, teacher training, and extension courses for non-matriculated students during a period when the university was pressured to specialize its programs and become increasingly elite.

Publications
During this period, Parkinson's academic career began to flourish as he published two critical works: W. B. Yeats, Self-Critic (1961) and W. B. Yeats, The Later Poetry (1964), which established him as an authority on the Anglo-Irish poet. He was also one of the first academic critics to appreciate and promote the works of Beat writers like Allen Ginsberg, but also of John Montague (poet), and Robert Duncan. He published his Casebook on the Beats in 1961. He became part of the circle of writers, including Lawrence Ferlinghetti, that helped evolve the San Francisco literary culture of the 1960s, and served as a unique voice as both critic and fellow-poet. Later volumes on Hart Crane and other poets won him acclaim. His last book, Poets, Poems, Movements (1987), is a collection of essays.

When Parkinson was an undergraduate at Cal he won the twenty-sixth Emily Chamberlain Cook Prize in Poetry in 1945, for his poem "Letter to a Young Lady" which was published as a stapleback that year by The Circle.

References

External links
Finding aid to the Thomas Parkinson papers at Columbia University Rare Book & Manuscript Library

1920 births
1992 deaths
University of California, Berkeley faculty
Writers from San Francisco
American academics of English literature
20th-century American poets
20th-century American non-fiction writers